The men's kumite +84 kilograms competition at the 2014 Asian Games in Incheon, South Korea was held on 4 October 2014 at the Gyeyang Gymnasium.

Schedule
All times are Korea Standard Time (UTC+09:00)

Results
Legend
H — Won by hansoku (8–0)
S — Won by shikkaku (Disqualification from the competition)

Main bracket

Repechage

References

External links
Official website

Men's kumite 85 kg